A mushroom festival is a food festival in which mushrooms are featured. There are numerous mushroom festivals held annually in:
 Telluride Mushroom Festival in Telluride, Colorado
 Mushroom Festival at Mount Pisgah Arboretum in Eugene, Oregon 
 Kennett Square, Pennsylvania 
 Morel Mushroom Festival held in Harrison, Michigan, Mesick, Michigan, and Boyne City, Michigan
 Fantastic Forage Mushroom Festival held in Laconia, New Hampshire
 Mushroom Mardi Gras Festival held in Morgan Hill, California
 Pacific Northwest Mushroom Festival in Lacey, Washington

References

Food and drink festivals in the United States
Fungi and humans
Food and drink festivals

Resources
 http://www.fantasticforage.com
 https://mushroomfestival.org
 https://www.visitphilly.com/things-to-do/events/kennett-square-mushroom-festival/